Hemiscolopendra marginata, the eastern bark centipede, is a common species of centipede found in the Eastern United States and parts of Mexico. H. marginata is the first centipede species shown to exhibit sexual dimorphism in venom composition.

Appearance 
Hemiscolopendra marginata is a species of medium-sized Scolopendrid centipede, with adults growing around 4 cm in length.

References 

Scolopendridae
Animals described in 1821
Taxa named by Thomas Say
Arthropods of the United States
Arthropods of Mexico